Anulocaulis annulatus is a species of flowering plant in the four o'clock family known by the common name valley ringstem. It is endemic to the Mojave Desert of California, especially in the vicinity of Death Valley. This is a perennial herb growing a number of thin, erect stems sometimes exceeding a meter in height from a thick caudex.

The smooth stems have darkened internodes at intervals which are glandular and sticky. The leaves are mostly located at the base of the plant. Each has a short petiole and a thick, bumpy blade up to 10 centimeters wide. The leaf is coated in large, stiff hairs with glandular bases. The branching inflorescence bears clusters of very hairy, tubular flowers. Each flower is just under a centimeter long with a greenish throat and a striped pink face. The fruit is a small, hard body about half a centimeter long.

See also 
 Anulocaulis

Nyctaginaceae

External links
Jepson Manual Treatment
USDA Plants Profile
Flora of North America
Photo gallery

Nyctaginaceae
Flora of California
Plants described in 1893
Flora without expected TNC conservation status